Svetlana Alekseyevna Romashina (born 21 September 1989) is a Russian synchronized swimmer that boasts 41 total gold medals from competing in four Olympic Games, seven world championships and six European championships. She has never placed lower than first at any of these events, and by adding two more golds in the 2020 Summer Olympics she broke all medal-count ties to become the most decorated athlete ever in her sport.

After leading the Russian Olympic Committee squad to victory at the Tokyo Games Romashina announced the end of her Olympic career.

Career

Early career
Born in Moscow, Romashina began training in artistic swimming at age six and quickly made her mark, winning two gold medals in team competition and combo routine at the 2005 World Aquatics Championships when she was 15 years old.

World Championships
After the 2019 World Aquatics Championships celebrated in Gwangju, South Korea, Romashina became the most titled athlete awarded in the history of synchronized swimming with 21 gold medals, having surpassed in this medals race her compatriot Natalia Ishchenko, who holds 19 gold medals of the World Championships.

Olympic Games
Romashina won four consecutive Olympic gold medals in the team competition at the 2008, 2012, 2016 and 2020 Summer Olympics. She also won the duet event at London and Rio de Janeiro with Natalia Ishchenko. At the 2020 Summer Olympics held in Tokyo in 2021, Romashina partnered Svetlana Kolesnichenko in the duet event, which they proceeded to win.

See also
 List of multiple Olympic gold medalists

References

External links
 
 

1989 births
Living people
Russian synchronized swimmers
Olympic medalists in synchronized swimming
Olympic gold medalists for Russia
Olympic gold medalists for the Russian Olympic Committee athletes
Olympic synchronized swimmers of Russia
Synchronized swimmers at the 2008 Summer Olympics
Synchronized swimmers at the 2012 Summer Olympics
Synchronized swimmers at the 2016 Summer Olympics
Synchronized swimmers at the 2020 Summer Olympics
Medalists at the 2008 Summer Olympics
Medalists at the 2012 Summer Olympics
Medalists at the 2016 Summer Olympics
Medalists at the 2020 Summer Olympics
World Aquatics Championships medalists in synchronised swimming
Synchronized swimmers at the 2005 World Aquatics Championships
Synchronized swimmers at the 2007 World Aquatics Championships
Synchronized swimmers at the 2009 World Aquatics Championships
Synchronized swimmers at the 2011 World Aquatics Championships
Synchronized swimmers at the 2013 World Aquatics Championships
Synchronized swimmers at the 2015 World Aquatics Championships
Artistic swimmers at the 2019 World Aquatics Championships
European Aquatics Championships medalists in synchronised swimming
Universiade medalists in synchronized swimming
Universiade gold medalists for Russia
Swimmers from Moscow
Medalists at the 2013 Summer Universiade
20th-century Russian women
21st-century Russian women